Heinrich Joachim Herterich (May/June 1772, Hamburg - 20 March 1852, Hamburg) was a German lithographer, painter and etcher.

Life and work 
He studied with his father, Johann Andreas Herterich (1725–1794), who was originally from Bayreuth. In 1804, he made a study trip to Paris. Initially, he worked as a portrait painter, in a style influenced by Claude Lorrain.

The following year, he returned to Hamburg with a team of specialists, in a joint venture with Johannes Michael Speckter, to establish the first lithography firm in Northern Germany. The company proved to be very successful, although Herterich personally continued to prefer painting to lithography. In 1825, he helped to set up a "Lithographic Institute" in Berlin, modelled after the one in Munich.

He remained closely connected to the Speckter family until his death; serving as a teacher for his partner's sons, Erwin and Otto.

He was interred at the Ohlsdorf Cemetery, adjacent to the plot belonging to the Speckters.

Further reading 
 Sylva van der Heyden: "Herterich, Heinrich Joachim", in: Bénédicte Savoy and France Nerlich (Eds.): Pariser Lehrjahre. Ein Lexikon zur Ausbildung deutscher Maler in der französischen Hauptstadt. Vol.1: 1793-1843, Berlin/Boston 2013, pp. 107–108

External links 

1772 births
1852 deaths
18th-century German painters
18th-century German male artists
German lithographers
German etchers
Artists from Hamburg
19th-century German painters
19th-century German male artists